Goran Zarić (born 19 September 1974) is an Australian-Serbian football defender.

Club career
After playing with FK Borac Čačak and FK Vojvodina in the First League of FR Yugoslavia he moved during the winter-break of the 1998–99 season to Switzerland and joined FC Lausanne-Sport.  During winter-break of 2000–01 he moved to FC Baulmes.  In summer 2002 he was back to Serbia, this time joining FK Čukarički.  In 2004, he played with FC Gazovik Izhevsk in the Russian Second Division.  In 2007, he joined Australian side South Melbourne FC playing in the Victorian Premier League.

Honors
Lausanne-Sport
Swiss Cup: 1999

References

1974 births
Living people
Australian soccer players
Serbian footballers
Association football defenders
FK Borac Čačak players
FK Vojvodina players
FK Čukarički players
First League of Serbia and Montenegro players
FC Lausanne-Sport players
FC Baulmes players
Expatriate footballers in Switzerland
Expatriate footballers in Russia
South Melbourne FC players